Courtenay Daley (born 6 November 1950) is a Jamaican cricketer. He played in five first-class matches for the Jamaican cricket team from 1971 to 1976.

See also
 List of Jamaican representative cricketers

References

External links
 

1950 births
Living people
Jamaican cricketers
Jamaica cricketers
Sportspeople from Kingston, Jamaica